R Cassiopeiae is a variable star in the northern constellation of Cassiopeia. It is located approximately 574 light years distant from the Sun, but is drifting closer with a radial velocity of −23 km/s. This is a pulsating Mira-type variable star with a brightness varies from magnitude +4.4 down to +13.5 with a period of 433.6 days. At its maximum, R Cassiopeiae is visible to the naked eye as a faint, red-hued star.

This aging red giant star has a stellar classification that varies from M6e to M10e, where the 'e' suffix indicates emission features in the spectrum. Currently on the asymptotic giant branch, it has 59% of the mass of the Sun with an oxygen rich chemical abundance. Having exhausted the supply of hydrogen at its core, the star has expanded to 263–310 times the Sun's radius.

See also
S Cassiopeiae
PZ Cassiopeiae
TZ Cassiopeiae

References

M-type giants
Mira variables
Emission-line stars

Cassiopeia (constellation)
Durchmusterung objects
224490
118188
9066
Cassiopeiae, R